Christopher Daniel Cooper (October 31, 1978 – March 11, 2023) was an American professional baseball pitcher, for San Marino Baseball Club in the Italian Baseball League.

Cooper was drafted by the Cleveland Indians in the 35th round of the 2001 MLB Draft out of the University of New Mexico. He remained in the Mets farm system through 2006 and spent 2007 in the Atlantic League of Professional Baseball before going to Italy.

Being of Italian descent, he played for the Italy national baseball team in the 2009 World Baseball Classic and  2013 World Baseball Classic.

Cooper died of a heart attack on March 11, 2023, at the age of 44.

References

External links

1978 births
2023 deaths
Baseball pitchers
2009 World Baseball Classic players
2013 World Baseball Classic players
Akron Aeros players
Mahoning Valley Scrappers players
Place of death missing
Columbus RedStixx players
Kinston Indians players
Buffalo Bisons (minor league) players
York Revolution players
Oklahoma City RedHawks players
New Mexico Lobos baseball players
Baseball players from Pittsburgh
American people of Italian descent